Arthur Faridovich Ali (born 1 January 1994 in Moscow, Russia) is a Russian curler.

He played lead for the Russian national men's curling team at the 2016 European Curling Championships.

Awards 
 World Junior Curling Championships: Silver (2013).
 European Junior Curling Challenge: Gold (2015), Silver (2012).

 Master of Sports of Russia.

Personal life

Teammates
2016 European Curling Championships
 Alexey Timofeev, Fourth, Skip
 Alexey Stukalskiy, Third
 Timur Gadzhikhanov, Second
 Artur Razhabov, Alternate

References

External links

Living people
1994 births
Russian male curlers
Curlers from Moscow
Competitors at the 2017 Winter Universiade